Digital Eclipse is an American video game developer based in Emeryville, California. Founded by Andrew Ayre in 1992, the company found success developing commercial emulations of arcade games for Game Boy Color. In 2003, the company merged with ImaginEngine and created Backbone Entertainment. A group of Digital Eclipse employees split off from Backbone to form Other Ocean Interactive, which, in 2015, bought and revived the Digital Eclipse brand. Among its staff is video game preservation specialist Frank Cifaldi.

History 
Digital Eclipse was founded in 1992 by Andrew Ayre, Hans Kim, John Neil, and Howard Fukuda. The company's first offices were opened on a "nondescript, factory-filled" street in Emeryville, California, where Ayre (a native of St. John's, Newfoundland and Labrador) had moved following his graduation from Harvard University to live with his girlfriend. Initially a technology startup company, Digital Eclipse soon found that their software would be useful in the video game industry, and turned to game development instead. Using their technology, the company opted to produce commercial emulations of arcade games, such as Williams Electronics' Joust, Defender, and Robotron: 2084. For these games, Digital Eclipse developed an interpreter that emulated the games' arcade machines' chipset, including the Motorola 6809 central processing unit. This approach was meant to have the emulations act true to the original versions of these games, and not carry any imperfections direct ports could have introduced. All three emulated games were released as part of The Digital Arcade series for Mac OS in 1995.

Digital Eclipse found further success when the Game Boy Color was released; the new handheld console included a central processing unit based on the architecture of the Zilog Z80, the processor used in older arcade machines. While other developers were moving on to develop for the more powerful PlayStation home console, Digital Eclipse developed about 60 games for their niche market on the Game Boy Color. These games included Klax, Spy Hunter, Moon Patrol, Paperboy, Joust, Defender, and 720°, as well as an original game, Tarzan, which Digital Eclipse produced for Activision. Digital Eclipse also opened a second studio in Vancouver, Canada. In February 2001, the company announced their move into the games market for "wireless Web" devices, hiring Scott Nisbet as director of wireless gaming, as well as Bruce Binder as Nisbet's consultant.

In 2003, Digital Eclipse merged with ImaginEngine, creating Backbone Entertainment; while ImaginEngine remained an independent studio within that structure, Digital Eclipse's studios became Backbone Emeryville and Backbone Vancouver, respectively. By this point, Digital Eclipse had produced 70 games on 11 different platforms. In February 2006, Backbone opened another subsidiary studio, Backbone Charlottetown, in Charlottetown, Prince Edward Island, Canada, under the lead of Ayre. In May 2007, the new studio, including Ayre and several former Digital Eclipse employees, spun off from Backbone and became Other Ocean Interactive, aiming at showcasing Digital Eclipse's former traits in a smaller fashion.

Backbone Vancouver was mostly dismantled in September 2008 and closed entirely in May 2009, while Backbone laid off the majority of its Emeryville-based staff in October 2012. On June 8, 2015, after acquiring the Digital Eclipse name, Other Ocean's parent company, Other Ocean Group, announced that it had reformed Digital Eclipse as part of its Other Ocean Emeryville studio. Co-founders include Ayre, Mike Mika—who had acted as technical director for the original Digital Eclipse—and former Gamasutra writer Frank Cifaldi. The new Digital Eclipse laid its focus on video game preservation, and Cifaldi became the studio's "head of restoration", a title which Cifaldi noted was an industry first. At the time, Cifaldi also stated that Digital Eclipse aimed at becoming the video game equivalent of The Criterion Collection.

Eclipse Engine 
Part of Digital Eclipse's work include their own Eclipse Engine, a tool that allows them to decompile the code from older games into a machine-readable format that is then used by the Eclipse Engine to play them on modern systems. While it may take some extra work by the company to decompile the older game into the proper format one time, this approach allows them to rapidly port the Eclipse Engine version to any modern gaming system, including personal computers, consoles, and portable and mobile devices, with minimal effort. This engine has been used in Digital Eclipse's Mega Man Legacy Collection and The Disney Afternoon Collection. The Eclipse Engine was primarily developed by Digital Eclipse's studio head, Mike Mika, and Other Ocean engineer Kevin Wilson, branched off from Other Ocean's Bakesale engine.

Games developed

As Digital Eclipse (1992–2004)

As Backbone Entertainment (2004–2012)

As Digital Eclipse (2015–present)

Notes

References

External links 
 

1992 establishments in California
Companies based in Emeryville, California
Video game companies based in California
American companies established in 1992
Video game companies established in 1992
Video game development companies
2015 mergers and acquisitions